Zac Etheridge (born July 6, 1988) is an American football coach and former safety who currently serves as the safeties/secondary coach at Auburn University. As a player, he was a four year starter and a team captain on Auburn's 2010 National Championship team.

High school career 
Etheridge attended Charles Henderson High School in Troy, Alabama. He initially played basketball and baseball before ultimately deciding to focus on football. Etheridge grew up watching Auburn and Alabama football and began to dream of playing for Auburn after watching the programs 2004 team and becoming enamored with the programs sense of "family and tradition". Described as scrawny, Etheridge originally struggled in gaining attention from major programs but would receive an offer from Auburn after attending a camp ran by the team. On August 14, 2005, he would commit to play college football at Auburn University.

College career 
Etheridge would make an immediate impact at Auburn, starting 12 out of 13 games as a freshman in 2007 and earning Freshman All-American honors with 65 tackles. Etheridge would remain a strong contributor for the Tigers as a sophomore, recording 75 tackles and one interception. In his junior season Etherdige would suffer a neck injury while attempting a tackle in a game against Ole Miss. Following the injury he lacked control over his body and was ultimately diagnosed with torn neck ligaments and a broken vertebrae. The injury threatened to end Etheridge's playing career but he would return to the field for his senior season in 2010 after completing 9 months of physical therapy. In 2010, he was named a team captain, started all 14 games and would have three interceptions on the season including one in the first quarter of the Tigers national championship victory over Oregon. In 2012, Etheridge was awarded the James Owens Courage Award, which is awarded to an Auburn player who demonstrates "courage in the face of adversity".

Coaching career 
Etheridge began his coaching career in 2012 when Bill O'Brien hired him as a graduate assistant at Penn State. He would then serve in the same role for two seasons at Georgia Tech before being hired by Western Carolina as a defensive backs and outside linebackers coach. In 2018, Etheridge would work as the defensive back coach at Louisiana. Following two seasons as the defensive backs coach at Houston, Etheridge would return to his alma mater in 2021. In 2022, following the firing of Bryan Harsin for Hugh Freeze it was announced that Etheridge would remain on the new staff, making him and running backs coach Cadillac Williams the only coaches retained by Freeze.

References

External links 

 Auburn profile
 Houston profile

1988 births
Living people
American football safeties
Auburn Tigers football coaches
Auburn Tigers football players
Houston Cougars football coaches
People from Troy, Alabama
Coaches of American football from Alabama
Players of American football from Alabama
African-American coaches of American football
African-American players of American football
20th-century African-American people
21st-century African-American sportspeople